William Duhurst Merrick (1793–1857) was a U.S. Senator from Maryland from 1838 to 1845. Senator Merrick may also refer to:

Pliny Merrick (1794–1867), Massachusetts State Senate
Raymond Merrick (born 1939), Kansas State Senate